The Irish League in season 1967–68 comprised 12 teams, and Glentoran won the championship.

League standings

Results

References

Northern Ireland - List of final tables (RSSSF)

NIFL Premiership seasons
1967–68 in Northern Ireland association football
Northern